Assume Crash Position is the second album by the Congolese musical group Konono Nº1, and the fourth volume in the group's Congotronics series, released by Crammed Discs.

Reception

Thom Jurek, in his review of the album for AllMusic, wrote that, for fans of Konono N°1, "Assume Crash Position is a necessary addition to the catalog. For the intrigued, this is an excellent starting point." Chris Martins of The A.V. Club gave the album a grade of "A−", noting that, despite the band's collaborations with such artists as Björk and Herbie Hancock, the album features "guest appearances not from their international cadre of high-profile fans, but from their friends in Kinshasa." Martins concludes that, after "so many 10-minute epics", the more stripped-down production of the final track on the album, "Nakobala Lisusu Te", "[offers] a glimpse into the soul of the band, which thankfully has been resistant to change."

Douglas Wolk of Pitchfork wrote that the album features the group's signature "amazing sound of electric likembes (metal thumb pianos) playing through fuzzed-up amps and jury-rigged mics, augmented by drums, the occasional whistle, and some call-and-response yelling. Reportedly, the band is used to playing for hours on end. They could go on like that forever, which is both Assume Crash Positions strength and its flaw."

Track listing

Personnel
Adapted from the album's liner notes.

 Mingiedi Mawangu – likembe, vocals, percussion
 Augustin Makuntima Mawangu – likembe, vocals
 Menga Waku – vocals, bass likembe
 Makona Mbuta – likembe
 Antoine Ndombele – bass likembe
 Pauline Mbuka Nsiala – vocals
 Vincent Visi – drums
 Ndofusu Mbiyavanga – percussion, tam tam
 Duki Makumbu – bass guitar

References

2010 albums
Konono Nº1 albums
Crammed Discs albums